The Ericsson R380 is a GSM smartphone developed by Ericsson Mobile Communications. It combines the functions of a mobile phone and a personal digital assistant (PDA), and was introduced at CEBIT on 18 March 1999.

Released in November 2000, it was the first device marketed as a 'smartphone'. In December 1999, the magazine Popular Science appointed Ericsson R380 to one of the most important advances in science and technology. It was a groundbreaking device, as it was as small and light as a normal mobile phone.

Hardware
The display was a black and white touchscreen, partially covered by a flip which, when opened, reveals a large wide display. For that reason it can be considered the clear forerunner of the popular P800/P900 series of smartphones. It predates the UIQ user interface which runs on those later phones, but again, the heritage is clear.

Software
The R380 ran the EPOC Release 5.1 operating system, which can thus be considered the first Symbian OS device. It uses a sophisticated user interface that originated as 'Emerald', one of the device family reference designs (DFRD) that was planned by Symbian Ltd. However users could not install their own software on the device.

The phone and the software was developed at Ericsson's lab in Kista, Sweden. The user interface (UI) was developed at Ericsson's Software Applications Laboratory in Warrington, UK. The UI was built using an in-house developed library called the Ericsson Control Kit (ECK).

The device was delivered in three variants. The most common being the R380s (dual 900/1800 GSM bands) and the (rarer) R380 World (dual 900/1900 GSM bands). The final variant with minor software and cosmetic upgrades was designated the R380e.

At introduction, the R380s pricing was around US$700 (compared to the T28s at US$500), and the device was never network-locked.

See also
Nokia 9210 Communicator

External links
 Pic

References

R380
Symbian devices
Ericsson
Mobile phones introduced in 2000